The Port of Abra de Ilog is a seaport in Abra de Ilog, Occidental Mindoro in the Philippines. It is the main seaport of northern Occidental Mindoro. Household consumption goods are the main cargoes imported in the port while outgoing cargoes are agricultural products such as corn, rice, and livestock. The port has a Passenger Terminal Building which occupies  of space and can accommodate up to 100 people. The port has an  RC pier with two ramps for RORO ferries. . As of 2016, Montenegro Shipping Lines and Besta Shipping Lines (orange navigation) have destinations from Abra de Ilog to Batangas, while Caribbean lines (pump boat) has a destination to Balatero (Puerto Galera).

References

Abra de Ilog Port
Buildings and structures in Occidental Mindoro
Transportation in Luzon